Notre-Dame International High School (NDIHS) in Verneuil-sur-Seine, a residential area west of Paris, France, is a private bilingual international school and is part of  École Notre-Dame les Oiseaux. Notre-Dame Les Oiseaux school was established in 1929 on the site of the 16th century Château de Verneuil.
This is one of the American schools in Paris metropolitan area. The school welcomes boarding and day school students and provides education for grades 10 to 12 (15 to 18 years old).

The school is a branch of the Nacel International School System (NISS) which is an international network of American styled High Schools such as Saint Paul Preparatory School in Minnesota and Saint Paul American School in Beijing, China. 
Students, who come from many different countries, receive an American and French based curriculum leading to the IB Diploma Program. Notre-Dame International High School is an IB World School  allowed offer the IB Diploma Programme since September 2018.

The school is AdvancED accredited.

Location

Notre-Dame International High School is located on the campus of Notre-Dame Les Oiseaux in the residential town of Verneuil-sur-Seine in the West of Paris, 35 minutes away from Paris by train. The "Vernouillet-verneuil" station (Train station near the school) has trains heading to Saint Lazare (Station to go to Paris) every 30 minutes.

Campus

The Château de Verneuil is located in the heart of an historical park covering an area of 13 hectares with centuries’ old trees and gardens.

Education
This French-American school of the Paris metropolitan area teaches an American secondary school curriculum developed at Saint Paul Preparatory School and leading to an English taught IB Diploma Programme in the French-speaking environment of Notre-Dame Les Oiseaux. In addition to the American curriculum taught by American teachers (ESL, Math, English, Social Studies, Science), the school offers French language and culture programs as well as enrichment courses taught by French teachers (Music, Art and Physical Education).

References

<https://www.ibo.org/school/051050/>
<http://paris.expatriatesmagazine.com/notre-dame-international-high-school-prepares-10th-anniversary/>
<http://www.ndoverneuil.com/etablissement/archives/revues/revue2016-2017.pdf>

External links
Notre-Dame International High School
Press review
International schools Database

International schools in Île-de-France
Boarding schools in France
Lycées in Yvelines
Catholic secondary schools in France
American international schools in France
International Baccalaureate schools in France
Private schools in France
Secondary schools in France